John Cosani (born November 7, 1988 in Lomas de Zamora) is an Argentinian DJ and music producer.

Discography

Albums

Singles & EPs
"Freefall", 2014
"Look Amsterdam", 2014

References

People from Buenos Aires
Argentine DJs
1988 births
Living people